The Women's 500 m time trial competition at the 2017 World Championships was held on 15 April 2017.

Results

Qualifying
The top 8 riders qualified for the final.

Final
The final was held at 19:03.

References

Women's 500 m time trial
UCI Track Cycling World Championships – Women's 500 m time trial
UCI